Conversations is the debut album by London-based group Woman's Hour. This album is mixture of indie pop, alternative and electronic pop. Adding swooning synths, clipped rhythms, and muted guitars, "Conversations" is new wave with a twist of some nocturnal R&B and soft disco.

Track listing
"Unbroken Sequence" (3:33)
"Conversations" (3:20)
"To the End" (4:27)
"Darkest Place" (4:06)
"In Stillness We Remain" (3:38)
"Our Love Has No Rhythm" (4:27)
"Her Ghost" (3:13)
"Two Sides of You" (3:34)
"Devotion" (4:23)
"Reflections" (3:46)
"The Day That Needs Defending" (3:32)

References 

2014 albums